Alf Boyd (22 October 1920 – 3 July 1998) was a Scottish professional footballer who played as a wing half.

Career
Born in Dundee, Boyd played in Scotland for Dundee North End, St Johnstone and Dundee; he was later player-coach of Marist Bros. in South Africa. He went on to manage Durban City.

Boyd played 235 games and scored 27 times for Dundee. He only missed six games in that period. He captained Dundee to consecutive League Cup wins.

Boyd was later on the backroom staff when Dundee won the League in 1962.

International career 
Boyd played for the Scotland  Schoolboys team against England in   1935.

His solitary senior international honour was being selected for the Scottish League against the Football League in 1949.

Honours 
 Scottish A Division:
Runners-up: 1948–49
 Scottish B Division
Champions: 1946–47
Scottish Cup:
Runners-up: 1951–52
Scottish League Cup:
Winners: 1951–52, 1952–53
Forfarshire Cup
Runners-up: 1950–51

References

1920 births
1998 deaths
Footballers from Dundee
Scottish footballers
Scottish expatriate footballers
Scottish expatriate football managers
Scottish football managers
Dundee North End F.C. players
St Johnstone F.C. players
Dundee F.C. players
Scottish Football League players
Association football wing halves
Scottish expatriate sportspeople in South Africa
Expatriate soccer players in South Africa
Expatriate soccer managers in South Africa
Scottish Football League representative players
Place of death missing
Durban City F.C. managers